Lewis Joseph Valentine (March 19, 1882 – December 16, 1946) was the New York City Police Commissioner from 1934 to 1945, under Mayor Fiorello H. LaGuardia during the Murder, Inc. era. He was the author of an autobiography Night stick: The autobiography of Lewis J. Valentine. He was Police Commissioner of New York for eleven years, longer than any other previous person in that position. Time magazine credited him with cleaning up the department so that New York City had one of the most honest police departments in the nation.

After New York, he advised the Tokyo Police Force.

Biography
He was born on March 19, 1882. Valentine joined the New York Police Department in 1903, at age 21. He specialized in combatting police corruption attracting the attention of Mayor LaGuardia who appointed him as the city's police commissioner in 1934.  He died on December 16, 1946.

References

See also
Tammany Hall

1882 births
1946 deaths
New York City Police Commissioners